Nursery Crimes can refer to

Nursery Crimes (band), an Australian band
"Nursery Crimes", an episode of Kim Possible 
 "Nursery Crimes/My Peeps", an episode of The Grim Adventures of Billy and Mandy
Nursery Crimes, a series of novels by Jasper Fforde
Nursery Crimes: Sexual Abuse in Day Care, a book by David Finkelhor and Linda M. Williams

See also
Nursery Cryme, a 1971 album by Genesis